Bobbie Natasha Kelsey (born December 30, 1972) is an American basketball coach for the WNBA.

Career
Hired in April 2011, her tenure at the University of Wisconsin ended on March 4, 2016. Her most recent coaching job was an assistant with the Los Angeles Sparks.

She has been an assistant coach for Stanford University, and a four-year player for the Cardinal. Kelsey spent three years as an assistant coach at Virginia Tech before returning to her alma mater prior to the 2007-08 campaign. She has also held assistant coaching positions at Western Carolina, Evansville, Florida, and Boise State. She currently works as a Conference Commissioner for the Milwaukee City Conference in Milwaukee WI which schedules and administers Game Scheduling, Officials Scheduling for all Milwaukee public high schools sports teams. Kelsey won the 2022 Milwauke Public Schools Employee Golf League Championship, playing for Team Central Services .

Head coaching record

References

1972 births
Living people
American women's basketball coaches
Florida Gators women's basketball coaches
People from Decatur, Georgia
Sportspeople from DeKalb County, Georgia
Sportspeople from Pontiac, Michigan
Stanford Cardinal women's basketball coaches
Stanford Cardinal women's basketball players
Virginia Tech Hokies women's basketball coaches
Western Carolina Catamounts women's basketball coaches
Wisconsin Badgers women's basketball coaches
Boise State Broncos women's basketball coaches
Evansville Purple Aces women's basketball coaches
People from Pontiac, Michigan
Los Angeles Sparks coaches